Chia-Chiao Lin (7 July 1916 – 13 January 2013) was a Chinese-born American applied mathematician and Institute Professor at the Massachusetts Institute of Technology.

Lin made major contributions to the theory of hydrodynamic stability, turbulent flow, mathematics, and astrophysics.

Biography
Lin was born in Beijing with ancestral roots in Fuzhou. In 1937 Lin graduated from the department of physics, National Tsinghua University in Beijing. 

After graduation he was a teaching assistant in the Tsinghua University physics department. In 1939 Lin won a Boxer Indemnity Scholarship and was initially supported to study in the United Kingdom. However, due to World War II, Lin and several others were sent to North America by ship. Unluckily, Lin's ship was stopped in Kobe, Japan, and all students had to return to China. 

In 1940, Lin finally reached Canada and studied at the University of Toronto from which he earned his M.Sc. In 1941. Lin continued his studies in the United States and received his PhD from the California Institute of Technology in 1944 under Theodore von Kármán. His PhD thesis provided a analytic method to solve a problem in the stability of parallel shearing flows, which was the subject of Werner Heisenberg's PhD thesis.

Lin also taught at Caltech between 1943 and 1945. He taught at Brown University between 1945 and 1947. Lin joined the faculty of the Massachusetts Institute of Technology in 1947. Lin was promoted to professor at MIT in 1953 and became an Institute Professor of MIT in 1963. He was President of the Society for Industrial and Applied Mathematics from 1972 to 1974. Lin retired from MIT in 1987.  

In 2002, he moved back to China and helped found the Zhou Pei-Yuan Center for Applied Mathematics (ZCAM) at Tsinghua University. He died in Beijing in 2013, aged 96.

Honors and awards
During his career Lin has received many prizes and awards, including:
 The first Fluid Dynamics Prize (from the American Physical Society, in 1979)
The 1976 NAS Award in Applied Mathematics and Numerical Analysis
 The 1975 Timoshenko Medal
 The 1973 Otto Laporte Award
 Caltech's Distinguished Alumni Award

Lin was a member of the National Academy of Sciences, the American Academy of Arts and Sciences, and the American Philosophical Society, cited in the American Men and Women of Science. and a Fellow of the American Association for the Advancement of Science. Lin was elected Academician of Academia Sinica in 1958, and became a Foreign Member of the Chinese Academy of Sciences in 1994.

References

External links

Lin's profile

1916 births
2013 deaths
Members of the United States National Academy of Sciences
Foreign members of the Chinese Academy of Sciences
Fellows of the American Association for the Advancement of Science
Fellows of the American Physical Society
Educators from Beijing
Mathematicians from Beijing
Chinese emigrants to the United States
20th-century American mathematicians
Massachusetts Institute of Technology faculty
Academic staff of Tsinghua University
Tsinghua University alumni
Boxer Indemnity Scholarship recipients
University of Toronto alumni
California Institute of Technology alumni
California Institute of Technology faculty
Brown University faculty
Fluid dynamicists
Members of Academia Sinica
Presidents of the Society for Industrial and Applied Mathematics
Florida State University faculty
Chinese mathematicians
Members of the American Philosophical Society